In mathematics,  the small Veblen ordinal is a certain large countable ordinal, named after Oswald Veblen.

There is no standard notation for ordinals beyond the Feferman–Schütte ordinal .

It is the ordinal that measures the strength of Kruskal's theorem. It is also the ordinal type of a certain ordering of rooted trees .

References

 

Ordinal numbers